Eagle Farm is a housing estate on the southeastern outskirts of Milton Keynes in Buckinghamshire, England, within the Wavendon civil parish. It was constructed to help the Milton Keynes urban area with its rapid increase in demand for housing. The site is part of the "Eastern Expansion Area" of Milton Keynes, identified in 2004 by the then government. The district has a primary school, St Mary's C of E Primary, with space for 600 pupils. , the estate is currently undergoing further development and construction, and is predicted to reach 2,900 homes as it grows.

Location
The estate lies opposite the Magna Park distribution centre, on the other side of the A421. It is on the eastern outskirts of Wavendon civil parish, just outside and overlooking the village itself. From March 2018 to December 2020, Milton Keynes City Council, Central Bedfordshire Council and the South East Midlands Local Enterprise Partnership worked on a project to dual the A421 from Eagle Farm Roundabout to Junction 13 of the M1 ( to the east of the estate), which has greatly improved accessibility to the wider road network.

External links

References

Areas of Milton Keynes